What's Be Happen? is the debut studio album by New Zealand reggae band Herbs. The album was released in July 1981 on the eve of the 1981 Springbok tour by Warrior Records, only the second album to be released by the label at that point. What's Be Happen? is often seen as the first album of both Pacific and New Zealand reggae, blending reggae themes and styles with traditional Polynesian rhythms and musical structure. This is seen through elements such as the use of Cook Islands pātē on the title track and frequent use of the so-called "Māori strum" method of guitar on tracks throughout the record. As a result, the album has been described as representing a watershed moment in the development of a distinct form of reggae within New Zealand and establishing Herbs as a prominent band within that. 

What's Be Happen? is overtly political, with lyrical topics including Apartheid and the Dawn Raids on Polynesian immigrants to New Zealand, as well as general commentary on life for Māori and Pasifika in New Zealand at the time. The album's cover art features an image of Māori protestors at Bastion Point in 1978 being surrounded by police, which saw the arrest of 222 people protesting the confiscation of Māori land formerly occupied by Ngāti Whātua Ōrākei, a significant event in the Māori protest movement. The album's title is a reference to Marvin Gaye's 1971 album What's Going On, reflecting the similar lyrical themes explored between the two albums. Political themes have since continued to be a core aspect of Herbs' music, with Herbs member Dilworth Karaka describing What's Be Happen? as "a strong indicator" of the political material they could continue to produce throughout the band's career.

Upon release, the album did not gain much mainstream traction and sold very little, peaking at 40 in the New Zealand charts and only placing on the charts for two weeks in August 1981. Despite this, the album has endured as a defining moment for Pacific reggae and, in 2015, was awarded the Independent Music NZ Classic Record award as part of that year's Taite Music Prize. Judges at the time said that this was to recognise the album as "a vital slice of [New Zealand's] cultural history and a landmark for Pacific reggae."

Track listing

Personnel 
 Dilworth Karaka – guitar, vocals
 Fred Faleauto – drums, vocals
 Phil Toms – bass
 Spenz Fusimalohi – guitar, vocals
 Toni Fonoti – lead vocals, percussion
 Gerard Carr – engineer
 Phil Yule – engineer

References

1981 debut albums
Herbs (band) albums